City of Adelaide was a steam cargo ship built in 1916-1917 by the William Gray & Company of West Hartlepool for Ellerman Lines of Liverpool. The ship served in World War I and was torpedoed at 12.10am on Sunday 11 August 1918. Her position was 3623n 1533e and the sinking took place five days after leaving Port Said for Liverpool in a convoy of 20 ships. The crew was saved.

References

1916 ships
Ships built on the River Tees
Merchant ships of the United Kingdom
Steamships of the United Kingdom
Ships sunk by German submarines in World War I
World War I shipwrecks in the Mediterranean Sea
Maritime incidents in 1918
City of Adelaide (1916)